Astola Island also known as Jezira Haft Talar (Urdu) Satadip or 'Island of the Seven Hills', is a small uninhabited Pakistani island in the Arabian Sea approximately  south of the nearest part of the coast and  southeast of the fishing port of Pasni. Administratively, the island is part of the Pasni subdistrict of Gwadar District in Balochistan province. The island can be accessed by motorized boats from Pasni, with a journey time of about 5 hours to reach the island. On August 4, 2020, Pakistan has released a new political map that for the first time shows the Islands of Churna and Astola.

Marine Protected Area 
Pakistan declared Astola as its first Marine Protected Area in June 2017 as part an international obligation of the Federal Government under the Convention on Biological Diversity and its Aichi Biodiversity Targets.

History
The earliest mention of Astola is in Arrian's account of Admiral Nearchos, who was dispatched by Alexander the Great to explore the coast of the Arabian Sea and the Persian Gulf in 325 BC. The sailors in Nearchos's fleet were "frightened at the weird tales told about an uninhabited island, which Arrian calls Nosala". It was also called Carmina, Karmine, by Arrian.

Geography
The island consists of a large tilted plateau and a series of seven small hillocks (hence the local name "Haft Talar" or "Seven Hills"), with deep chasms and crevices, which are several feet wide. There are several natural caves and coves on the island. The south face of the island slopes off gradually whereas the north face is cliff-like with a sharp vertical drop.

Ecology
Isolation has helped maintain several endemic life forms on Astola. The endangered green turtle (Chelonia mydas) and the hawksbill turtle (Eretmochelys imbracata) nest on the beach at the foot of the cliffs. The island is also an important area for endemic reptiles such as the Astola viper (Echis carinatus astolae). The island is reported to support a large number of breeding water birds including coursers, curlews, godwit, gulls, plovers and sanderling. Feral cats originally introduced by fishermen to control the endemic rodent population, pose an increasing threat to wildlife breeding sites. E.g. the sooty gull (Larus hemprichii) had a major breeding colony on the island, now extirpated because of introduced rats.

Vegetation on the island is sparse and largely consists of scrubs and large bushes. There are no trees on the island. The largest shrub on the island is Prosopis juliflora, which was introduced into South Asia in 1877 from South America. There is no source of fresh water on the island and the vegetation depends on occasional rainfall and soil moisture for survival. Astola is also home to coral reef.

Man-made features
In 1982, the Government of Pakistan installed a lighthouse on the island for the safety of passing vessels, which was replaced by a solar-powered one in 1987.

Between October and May of each year, Astola becomes a temporary base for mainland fishermen for catching lobsters and oysters. From June to August, the island remains uninhabited due to the fishing off-season, the rough seas and high tides.

There is a small mosque dedicated to the Muslim saint Pir Khawaja Khizr, which is used by the mainland fishermen during the fishing season. Ruins of an ancient Hindu temple of the Hindu goddess, Kali are located on the island. The island was also known to the Hindus as Satadip.

In Arrian's Indica, which describes the westward journey of Alexander's fleet after the  Indian Campaign (325 BC), Admiral Nearchus is quoted as having anchored by an island named 'Carnine'. It was said to be inhabited by the Ichthyophagoi ('fish eaters' in Greek) and where, "even mutton had a fishy taste". The Persian phrase mahi khoran (fish eaters) has become the modern name of the coastal region of Makran. Some scholars have assumed Carnine to be Astola, without considering the extreme aridity and lack of fresh water, which renders the place inhospitable for human habitation, as well as animal husbandry. In all likelihood, Carnine was the name of an island in the inland sea, presently known as Khor Kalmat. This latter conjecture supports Nearchus' coast-hugging voyage (which would have kept him well away from Astola), a compulsion meant to provision Alexander's army that was supposed to have marched along a coastal route.

Gallery

See also

List of lighthouses in Pakistan
List of islands of Pakistan

References

External links
Astola Island – A Spellbinding Site 
Astola Island
Astola Island...

Islands of the Arabian Sea
Uninhabited islands of Pakistan
Gulf of Oman
Islands of Gwadar
Natural history of Balochistan, Pakistan
Ramsar sites in Pakistan
Lighthouses in Pakistan